The 1922 Michigan gubernatorial election was held on November 7, 1922. Incumbent Republican Alex J. Groesbeck defeated Democratic nominee Alva M. Cummins with 61.15% of the vote.

General election

Candidates
Major party candidates
Alex J. Groesbeck, Republican
Alva M. Cummins, Democratic 
Other candidates
Benjamin Blumenberg, Socialist
Belden C. Hoyt, Prohibition
E. R. Markley, Socialist Labor

Results

Primaries

Democratic Primary

Republican Primary

References

1922
Michigan
Gubernatorial
November 1922 events